Bang Son station is a Bangkok MRT station on the Purple Line on Bangkok-Nonthaburi Road in Bang Sue District, Bangkok. It provides transfers to SRT Light Red Line at Bang Son station, and the State Railway of Thailand at Bang Son halt.

References

External links
Bang Son station

MRT (Bangkok) stations